Young Lust may refer to:

 Young Lust (comics), an underground comics anthology series that debuted in 1970
 "Young Lust" (song), a 1979 song by Pink Floyd
 "Young Lust", a song performed by Ellen Foley on the 1979 album Night Out
 Young Lust (film) (1984), starring Fran Drescher
 Young Lust: The Aerosmith Anthology, a 2001 compilation album
 "Young Lust", a song by Aerosmith from the 1989 album Pump, and included on the compilation album

See also
 Young Love (disambiguation)